Eric Fenson (born May 6, 1971 in Bemidji, Minnesota) is an American curler. He lives in Bemidji and curls out of the Bemidji Curling Club. He is a former national champion, and skips his own team.

Career
Fenson began curling at the age of ten. He was a state junior champion and state champion, and competed in the United States Men's Junior Curling Championship, finishing third in 1990 and winning the championship in 1991 and 1992. He won a bronze medal at the 1991 World Junior Curling Championships, which he was named 1991 USCA Male Athlete of the Year for, and finished fifth in 1992. He appeared at his first national men's championship in 1996, and participated in the 1998, 1999 and 2001 national championships, with his best finish as a semifinalist in 1999. In 2003, with his brother Pete skipping, Fenson won the national championship and participated in the 2003 Ford World Men's Curling Championship, finishing eighth. The next year, his team finished as runners-up in the nationals to Jason Larway.

Fenson then left his brother's team and joined Scott Baird. With his new team, he participated in the 2005 United States Olympic Curling Trials, finishing fifth. In 2010, he joined Mike Farbelow to participate in the nationals, and finished as a runner-up. Fenson, under Farbelow, then attempted to qualify for the nationals in 2011, but did not advance past the Challenge Round. Fenson then formed his own team, and made it through the qualifying rounds of the 2012 National Championships, qualifying for the nationals via the Challenge Round.

Personal life
Fenson graduated from Bemidji State University with a bachelor's degree in business administration. Fenson owns a carpet and upholstery cleaning company.

Fenson is married and has two children, Riley and Kylen. He enjoys golf, fishing, travelling, and spending time with his family. His brother, Pete Fenson, is a curler known for winning the bronze medal at the 2006 Winter Olympics.

Teams

References

External links

1971 births
Living people
People from Bemidji, Minnesota
American male curlers
American curling champions
Continental Cup of Curling participants